Bishop Ivan Kulyk (born 16 March 1979 in Perevoloka, Buchach Raion, Ternopil Oblast, Ukrainian SSR) is a Ukrainian Greek Catholic hierarch as the first Eparchial Bishop of Kamyanets-Podilskyi since 10 September 2019.

Life
Bishop Kulyk, after graduation of the school education, joined the Major Theological Seminary in Ternopil in 1997 and then continued his studies in the Catholic University of Lublin in Poland. After returning in Ukraine he was ordained as priest on 8 May 2005 for Ukrainian Catholic Eparchy of Ternopil, and during 2005–2009 he attended Patristic Institute Augustinianum in Rome, Italy, receiving a licentiate degree in the patristic theology.

At the same time, while studied in Rome, during 2006–2009 he served as a parish priest in the different Ukrainian Catholic communities in Italy and in 2009 was appointed as a parish priest of Santi Sergio e Bacco.

On 10 September 2019, his election by the Synod of Bishops of the Ukrainian Greek Catholic Church as the first eparchial bishop of Kamyanets-Podilskyi, Ukraine was confirmed by Pope Francis. On 1 December 2019 he was consecrated as bishop by Major Archbishop Sviatoslav Shevchuk and other hierarchs of the Ukrainian Greek Catholic Church in the Nativity of Mary Cathedral in Khmelnytskyi.

References

1979 births
Living people
People from Ternopil Oblast
Patristic Institute Augustinianum alumni
John Paul II Catholic University of Lublin alumni
Ukrainian Eastern Catholics
Bishops of the Ukrainian Greek Catholic Church
Bishops appointed by Pope Francis